Cicheng is a town in the Jiangbei District of Ningbo in Zhejiang. It is an ancient walled city dating from the 8th century when it was renowned for its handicrafts. As of 2012 the town and its ancient traditions were being revived by the government of Ningbo through the Cicheng Development Company and the Cicheng Innovation Cultural Park where demonstrations of traditional handicrafts by skilled craftsmen are presented. Traditional craftsmen are encouraged to settle in the town and establish workshops.

Notes

External links

Yu, Genyue. "Cicheng'an Age-old Town" City of Ningbo. (Archive)
Homepage Cicheng.org

Ningbo
Tourist attractions in Ningbo
Major National Historical and Cultural Sites in Zhejiang